Hugh Cunningham may refer to:
 Hugh Cunningham (British Army officer)
 Hugh Cunningham of Bonnington, Lord Provost of Edinburgh 
 Hugh Cunningham (historian)